In medical contexts, a facies is a distinctive facial expression or appearance associated with a specific medical condition. The term comes from Latin for "face". As a fifth declension noun, facies can be both singular and plural.

Types
Examples include:
 Hippocratic facies – eyes are sunken, temples collapsed, nose is pinched with crusts on the lips, and the forehead is clammy
 Moon face (also known as "Cushingoid facies") – Cushing's syndrome
 Elfin facies – Williams syndrome
 Potter facies – oligohydramnios
 Mask like facies – parkinsonism
 Leonine facies – lepromatous leprosy or craniometaphyseal dysplasia
 Mitral facies  – mitral stenosis
 Amiodarone facies (deep blue discoloration around malar area and nose)
 Acromegalic facies – acromegaly
 Flat facies – Down syndrome
 Marfanoid facies – Marfan's syndrome
 Snarling facies – myasthenia gravis
 Myotonic facies – myotonic dystrophy
 Torpid facies – myxoedema
 Mouse facies – chronic kidney failure
 Plethoric facies – Cushing's syndrome and polycythemia vera
 Bird facies – Pierre Robin sequence
 Ashen grey facies – myocardial infarction
 Gargoyle facies – Hurler's syndrome
 Monkey facies – marasmus
 Hatchet facies – myotonia atrophica
 Gorilla-like face – acromegaly
 Bovine facies (or cow face) – craniofacial dysostosis or crouzon syndrome
 Marshall halls facies – hydrocephalus
 Frog face – intranasal disease
 Coarse facies – many inborn errors of metabolism
 Adenoid facies – developmental facial traits caused by adenoid hypertrophy, nasal airway obstruction and mouthbreathing; really a form of long face syndrome.
 Lion-like facies – involvement of craniofacial bones in Paget disease of Bone
 Chipmunk facies – beta thalassemia
 Treacher Collins syndrome – deformities of the ears, eyes, cheekbones, and chin

Other disorders associated with syndromic facies 

 Pitt–Hopkins syndrome
 Beta thalassemia is associated with distinctive facial features due to ineffective erythropoiesis. The ineffective erythropoiesis causes marrow hyperplasia or expansion and bony changes, including the bones of the face; this causes craniofacial protrusions.
Mowat–Wilson syndrome

 Snijders Blok-Campeau syndrome

See also
 Body habitus

References

External links 

 Face in Clinical Medicine
 wikt:facies

Medical signs